Events from the 1360s in Denmark.

Incumbents 
 Monarch – Valdemar IV of Denmark

Events 

1360
 24 May  Valdemar IV's håndfæstning is signed.

1361
 27 July  The Battle of Visby.

1362
 13 January  The Saint Marcellus's flood.
 6 July  The Battle of Helsingborg.

1363
 9 April  The wedding of Haakon VI and Princess Margaret (later Margaret I of Denmark) is held in Copenhagen.

1364
 Vordingborg Castle is built around this time.

1366
 Thr Confederation of Cologne, a military alliance against Denmark, is formed.

1367
 The Hansa towns allies themselves with Sweden, Mecklenburg, and Holstein, and the Confederation of Cologne goes to war against Denmark and Norway.

1358
 Copenhagen is successfully invaded by the Hanseatic League during the Second Danish-Hanseatic War.

1369
 Absalon's Castle in Copenhagen  is destroyed.

Undated
 Vesborg is constructed on the island of Samsæ.

Births

Deaths 
 11 June 1363  Christopher, Duke of Lolland, duke (born 1341)
 1364 – Valdemar III of Denmark, King of Denmark (born 1314)

References 

1360s  in Denmark